Calvin Jackson Hobson III (born March 30, 1945) is an American politician in the state of Oklahoma.

Early life, family, and education

Hobson was born in 1945 in Tucson, Arizona as the eldest son of Wardena and Calvin Jackson Hobson II, his parents having met while attending the University of Oklahoma. Hobson's father served in the United States Army Air Corps training pilots during World War II.  Returning to Oklahoma, the Hobson family settled on a family farm in Wayne, OK where his father entered the oil and gas industry.  The family later moved to Lexington, OK where Hobson graduated high school.  Cal Hobson attended the University of Oklahoma and graduated with a degree in education.  He later went on to study political science in graduate school at the University of Oklahoma.  He married Mary E. Jernigan and together they had one son, Jack.

Military career

Upon graduation in 1969, Hobson received his officers commission into the United States Air Force and served in active duty capacity from 1969 - 1976 in the United Kingdom, Greece and at the Pentagon in Washington, DC.  While serving in the Oklahoma National Guard, Hobson was deployed abroad in 1989, during the United States invasion of Panama resulting in the ouster of General Manuel Noriega.  Later, Hobson attended and graduated from the United States Air War College receiving his graduate diploma.  After thirty years of service in both active duty and reserve capacity, Hobson retired in 1999 at the rank of colonel (United States).  Before his retirement, Col. Hobson served at Tinker Air Force Base and in the administration of National Guard Commander Major General Rita Aragon.

Political career

Having returned to Oklahoma, Hobson was elected the Mayor of Lexington, OK in 1976.  Hobson's full political career stretched for thirty years having first served in the Oklahoma House of Representatives from 1978 to 1990.  During his career in the Oklahoma House of Representatives, Hobson served as Chairman of the House appropriations subcommittee on public safety and later was appointed Chairman of the House appropriations full committee.  In 1990, he was elected to the Oklahoma State Senate where he served as chairman of the Senate appropriations subcommittee on public safety and judiciary; chairman of the Senate appropriations subcommittee on education; and vice-chairman of the full Senate appropriations committee.  He served there until his retirement in 2006.  Hobson also served as the President pro tempore of the Oklahoma State Senate from 2003 to 2005.  In 2006, Hobson unsuccessfully ran for the office of Lieutenant Governor of Oklahoma, ultimately losing the Democratic primary to Jari Askins.  Areas of legislative concern for Hobson were higher education funding, prison reform and mental health services.

During his political career, Cal was instrumental in securing funding for several key facilities associated with the University of Oklahoma, notably the Sam Noble Oklahoma Museum of Natural History, the OU National Weather Center, the Sarkeys Energy Center, and a significant expansion of the Fred Jones Jr. Museum of Art.

Later life

After retirement from politics, Hobson worked at the University of Oklahoma College of Liberal Studies where he still regularly teaches courses on Oklahoma political history. Hobson continues to write regularly for several newspapers including The Norman Transcript and The Oklahoma Observer.  Cal Hobson resides in Lexington, Oklahoma on a fifth generation-owned family farm, having come into the family possession during the Oklahoma land rush of 1889.

References

1945 births
Living people
Farmers from Oklahoma
Democratic Party Oklahoma state senators
20th-century Members of the Oklahoma House of Representatives
Politicians from Tucson, Arizona
Democratic Party members of the Oklahoma House of Representatives